The Hard-Boiled Canary is a 1941 American musical comedy film directed by Andrew L. Stone and written by Robert Lively and Andrew L. Stone. It was later reissued as There's Magic in Music.

The film stars Allan Jones, Susanna Foster, Margaret Lindsay, Lynne Overman, Grace Bradley, William Collier Sr. and Heimo Haitto. It was released on June 8, 1941, by Paramount Pictures.

Plot
Young and carefree Michael Maddy helps run Interlochen Center for the Arts for his ill father. A burlesque performer in a skimpy costume, Toodles LaVerne, impresses him with her voice, enough so that Michael makes and wins a wager with opera-company publicist George Thomas that she's good enough to sing professionally.

The joint is raided and entertainer Madie Duvalle is arrested by the police, but Toodles gets away with Michael's help. He enrolls her in the music camp over the objections of Sylvia Worth, his efficiency expert, and other campers partly because of Toodles's appearance and also because she can't even read music. Michael and George scrub off the stage makeup over Toodles's objections, whereupon she sings a number that impresses everyone at camp. Michael wants her to audition for a New York City opera house.

Madie, out of jail now, does a magazine story about Toodles' past life. The music camp's appalled financial backers pull their funds and their students. In the end, though, Michael manages to get Toodles in front of the opera company, where she wins everyone's approval.

Cast   
Allan Jones as Michael Maddy
Susanna Foster as Toodles LaVerne
Margaret Lindsay as Sylvia Worth
Lynne Overman as George Thomas
Grace Bradley as Madie Duvalie
William Collier, Sr. as Dr. Joseph E. Maddy
Heimo Haitto as Heimo Haitto
Peter Meremblum as Peter Meremblum
William Chapman as William Chapman
Kaye Connor as Kaye Connor
Diana Lynn as Dolly Loehr
Patricia Travers as Patricia Travers
Richard Bonelli as himself
Richard Hageman as Richard Hegeman
Irra Petina as Irra Petine
Tandy MacKenzie as Tandy MacKenzie
Fay Helm as Miss Wilson
Esther Dale as Miss Clark
Deems Taylor as Deems Taylor
 Bertram Marburgh as 	Mr. Myers 
 Carol Holloway as 	Nurse

References

External links
 

1941 films
American musical comedy films
1941 musical comedy films
Paramount Pictures films
Films directed by Andrew L. Stone
American black-and-white films
1940s English-language films
1940s American films